

France
French India – Jean Law de Lauriston, Governor of French India (1767–1777)
Isle de France (Mauritius)
 Jean Guillaume Steinauer, Acting Governor General of Mauritius (1768–1769)
 François Julien du Dresnay, chevalier Desroches, Governor-General of Mauritius (1769–1772)

Great Britain
 Bahamas – William Shirley, Governor of the Bahamas (1760–1775)
 Bengal -
 Harry Verelst, Governor of Bengal (1767-1769)
 John Cartier, Governor of Bengal (1769-1772)
 Bermuda – George James Bruere, Governor of Bermuda (1764–1780)
 Bombay – Thomas Hodges, Governor of Bombay (1767–1771)
Connecticut Colony –
 William Pitkin, Governor  (1766–1769)
 Jonathan Trumbull, Governor  (1769–1776)
 East Florida – James Grant, Governor (1763–1771)
 Province of Georgia – James Wright, Governor of Georgia (1760–1776)
 Gibraltar – Edward Cornwallis, Governor of Gibraltar (1761–1776)
 Gold Coast –
 Gilbert Petrie, Governor of the Committee of Merchants of the Gold Coast (1766–1769)
 John Crossle, Governor of the Committee of Merchants of the Gold Coast (1769–1770)
 Jamaica – William Trelawny, Governor (1767–1772)
 Madras – Charles Bourchier, President of the East India Company based at Madras (1767–1770)
 Isle of Man – John Wood, Governor of the Isle of Man (1761–1777)
Province of Maryland –
 Horatio Sharpe, Governor (1753–1769)
 Robert Eden, Governor (1769–1776)
Province of Massachusetts Bay
 Francis Bernard, Governor (1760–1769)
 Thomas Hutchinson, Governor  (1769–1774)
 Newfoundland Colony – John Byron, Commodore-Governor of Newfoundland (1769–1771)
 Province of New Hampshire – John Wentworth, Governor of New Hampshire (1767–1775)
Province of New Jersey – William Franklin, Governor (1763–1776)
Province of New York –
 Henry Moore, Governor (1765–1769)
 Cadwallader Colden, Acting Governor (1769–1770)
Province of North Carolina – William Tryon, Governor (1765–1771)
Province of Pennsylvania
 Chief Proprietor – Thomas Penn, 1746–1771
 Lieutenant Governor – John Penn 1763–1771
Colony of Rhode Island and Providence Plantations
 Josias Lyndon, Governor (1768–1769)
 Joseph Wanton, Governor (1769–1775)
Province of South Carolina –
 Charles Montagu, Governor (1766–1773)
 William Bull II, Acting Governor of South Carolina during Montagu's frequent and prolonged absences
Colony of Virginia – Norborne Berkeley, Governor of Virginia (1768–1770)
 West Florida
 Montfort Browne, Governor (1767–1769)
 John Eliot, Governor (1769)
 Elias Durnford, Governor (1769–1770)

Netherlands
Ceylon – Iman Willem Falck, Governor (1765–1785)

Ottoman Empire
Algiers – Muhammad V, Dey of Algiers (1766–1791)

Portugal
 Angola – Francisco Inocéncio de Sousa Coutinho, Governor of Angola (1764–1772)
 Macau – Diogo Fernandes Salema e Saldanha, Governor of Macau (1767–1770)

Spain
 Captaincy General of Chile – Juan de Balmaseda, Governor of Chile (1768–1770)
 Louisiana –
 Charles Philippe Aubry, Acting Governor of Louisiana (1768–1769)
 Alejandro O'Reilly, Captain-General of Louisiana (1769)
Mexico – Carlos Francisco de Croix, Viceroy of Mexico (1766–1771)

Colonial governors
Colonial governors
1769